The Messerschmitt Me 310 was a prototype German heavy fighter of World War II. It was a project to save the aerodynamically troubled Me 210.

Design and development
The armament was to be the same as the Me 210 A-1: two 20 mm MG 151/20 cannon, two 7.92 mm (.312 in) MG 17 machine guns, and two remotely controlled, rearward-firing 13 mm (.51 in) MG 131 machine guns.

A single aircraft was built by converting Me 210 V13 (code GI+SQ). It had a pressurised cockpit and was powered by two 1,380 kW (1,850 hp) Daimler-Benz DB 603A inline engines. The Me 310 first flew on 11 September 1943, but the project was cancelled later the same year, as it showed hardly any aerodynamic improvement over the Me 210. A subsequent prototype, the Me 410, showed sufficient improvement in its aerodynamics to be put into production.

Specifications (Me 310)

See also

References

http://www.historyofwar.org/articles/weapons_me_310.html

Me 310
1940s German fighter aircraft
Abandoned military aircraft projects of Germany
Low-wing aircraft
Twin piston-engined tractor aircraft